"Can I Get a Witness" is a song composed by Brian Holland, Lamont Dozier, and Eddie Holland and produced by Brian Holland and Lamont Dozier as a non-album single for American recording vocalist Marvin Gaye, who issued the record on Motown's Tamla imprint in September 1963.

Recording
Recorded at Motown's Hitsville U.S.A. studios on July 17, 1963, the song's lyrical writer Eddie Holland discussed going over the song once with Gaye, who had complained to the producers about singing their songs above his vocal range, something he would later complain about during recording sessions for his rendition of "I Heard It Through the Grapevine".

According to Holland, once Gaye heard Holland perform the song to him, he nodded and stated, "okay I'm ready" to a perplexed Holland, who often had to work over the song a few times with other artists who recorded their songs. According to Holland, Gaye recorded the song in one take, which impressed Holland, his brother and Dozier. Holland would later call Gaye "the most versatile vocalist I ever worked with."

On the song, backed by a boogie woogie-styled piano riff played by Funk Brothers pianist Earl Van Dyke, Gaye performs the song in a gospel harmony with members of The Supremes and Holland-Dozier-Holland backing him up on background vocals. Gaye performs the song mostly in a tenor range but occasionally sings in both the baritone and falsetto ranges.

Release
Released in September 1963 as the follow-up to Gaye's top ten hit, "Pride and Joy", the song peaked at No. 22 on the Hot 100 on 28 December 1963 and also became one of Gaye's earlier international hit singles, making a buzz in the United Kingdom, primarily among dance clubs in London and northern England (particularly Leeds), and also charted in France where it peaked at number 29 on its chart.  At 16 weeks, "Can I Get a Witness" lasted longer than any other Marvin Gaye entry on the Hot 100 during the 1960s.  Gaye performed the song live at the T.A.M.I. Show and lip-synching the song while appearing on the Hollywood A Go-Go in 1964 and also on the BBC show, Ready, Steady, Go! in 1965.

Covers and later versions 
"Can I Get a Witness" was notably covered by the Rolling Stones on their first album, The Rolling Stones in 1964. The Stones also recorded a self-composed instrumental sequel called "Now, I've Got a Witness" on that same album.

Dusty Springfield also recorded a version in 1964 for her second EP Dusty on Philips.

Stevie Wonder recorded a version of the song for his album I Was Made to Love Her, released in 1967.

Checkmates, Ltd. released a version of the song as part of a medley on their 1967 debut album, Live! At Caesar's Palace.

The Buckinghams recorded a version on their 1968 album "In One Ear and Gone Tomorrow".

English singer Sam Brown included the song on her Stop! album in 1988. Released as a single in 1989, her version peaked at number 15 in the United Kingdom and Ireland, number 17 in Australia, and number nine in New Zealand.

The Supremes, who appeared as background vocalists on Marvin Gaye's original, later recorded a version in 1966; however their version remained unreleased until 1987.

Elton John performed the song at Bob Geldof's Live Aid Concert on July 13, 1985.

Lee Michaels followed up "Do You Know What I Mean" with his version of "Can I Get a Witness", which peaked at number 39 on Christmas Day 1971, eight years to the week after Gaye's version peaked at number 22. His version used organ chords that were similar to his previous hit "Do You Know What I Mean". It was featured on his 1971 album, 5th.

Personnel
Lead vocals by Marvin Gaye
Background vocals by Holland–Dozier–Holland (Brian Holland, Lamont Dozier, and Eddie Holland) and the Supremes (Diana Ross, Florence Ballard, and Mary Wilson)
Instrumentation by the Funk Brothers
Baritone saxophone – Eugene Moore
Bass – Clarence Isabel
Drums – Benny Benjamin
Guitar – Eddie Willis
Organ – George Fowler
Piano – Johnny Griffith
Tenor saxophone – Hank Cosby
Trombone – Patrick Lanier, Paul Riser
Trumpet – Marcus Belgrave, Russell Conway

References

1963 songs
1963 singles
1971 singles
Songs written by Holland–Dozier–Holland
Marvin Gaye songs
The Supremes songs
Checkmates, Ltd. songs
Lee Michaels songs
Song recordings produced by Brian Holland
Song recordings produced by Lamont Dozier
Tamla Records singles
A&M Records singles
Northern soul songs